Penicillium brefeldianum is an anamorph fungus species of the genus of Penicillium which produces Brefeldin A a fungal metabolite.

See also
List of Penicillium species

Further reading

References

brefeldianum
Fungi described in 1967